Gideon Elliott (17 April 1828 – 15 February 1869) was an Australian cricketer. He played nine first-class cricket matches for Victoria. In February 1858, in a match against Tasmania, he took nine wickets in the first innings. He bowled 19 overs, including 17 maidens, conceding just two runs.

See also
 List of Victoria first-class cricketers

References

1828 births
1869 deaths
Australian cricketers
Victoria cricketers
People from Surrey
Melbourne Cricket Club cricketers